Lilian Gladys Tompkins (1893–1984) was a notable New Zealand nurse and prisoner of war. She was born in Halcombe, Manawatu/Horowhenua, New Zealand in 1893.

References

1893 births
1984 deaths
New Zealand nurses
New Zealand prisoners of war in World War II
People from Halcombe
New Zealand women nurses
New Zealand military nurses
World War II prisoners of war held by Japan